The Undavalli Caves, a monolithic example of Indian rock-cut architecture and one of the finest testimonials to ancient , are located in Vijayawada of Guntur district in the Indian state of Andhra Pradesh. It is one of the centrally protected monuments of national importance.

History 
Carved out of a solid sandstone on a hillside, these caves date back to the 4th to 5th centuries and is a paradise for history lovers. One of the preserved monuments of national importance, this attraction was originally the Jain caves and was later converted into a Hindu temple.These four-storey caves are said to be found in the 7th century. They are associated with the Vishnukundin Kings of AD 420- AD 620.

These caves are carved in Gupta style of rock-cut Architecture which goes back to 4th-5th century CE. Most of emperor of Gupta's were Vaishnavas so we can see many sculpture of Narasimha, Vishnu and Ramayans stories.  They are associated with the Vishnukundina kings of 420-620 CE. These caves are dedicated to Anantha Padmanabha and Narashimha. Some believe that Jain and Buddhist monks used these caves.

Chronology
These caves were carved out of solid sandstone on a hillside in the 4th to 5th centuries CE. There are several caves and the best known largest one has four stories with a huge recreated statue of Vishnu in a reclining posture, sculpted from a single block of granite inside the second floor. It was originally a Buddhist cave resembling the architecture of Udayagiri and Khandagiri. It is estimated that these caves were sculpted sometime in 4-5th century CE during the reign of Vishnukundina kings The main cave is one of the earliest examples of Gupta architecture, primarily primitive rock-cut monastery cells carved into the sandstone hills. Initially, the caves were shaped as a Jain abode and the first-floor abode still retains the Jain style; the vihara exhibits Jain monastics and includes tirthankara sculptures. This first level of the cave is a carved vihara and includes Buddhist artwork. The site served as the Bhikkhu monastic complex during ancient period. The walls of the caves display sculptures carved by skilled craftsmen.

The caves are surrounded by green countryside. From the high hill above the cave overlooking the Krishna River many fine specimens of rock-cut architecture can be seen. These caves are part of Mangalagiri Tadepalle Municipal Corporation.

Architecture 
It is an Impressive Four storey rock cut temple with East facing facade of 29m long, 16m wide. There are variation in depth of each floor. The ground floor is an unfinished low pillared hall with 8 pillars and 7 door openings on façade. The first storey accommodates triple shrine at back, each with the pillared hall in front, originally dedicated to the Trinity (Siva, Vishnu, and Brahma).

Sculptures on the walls represent Vaishnava deities. The second storey has a pillared rectangular shrine of Vishnu on a serpent. Sculptures of Shiva and Vaishnava and a few like the Vaishnava Alwars are sculptured later on. The top floor was unfinished with a Triple Shrine. Some of the sculptural specimens are attributed to Chalukyan period. It has 5 meter long statue of Vishnu in reclining position.
However, it may be difficult to conclude that the 5 meter long statue is lord Vishnu, because well accepted position of lord Vishnu are one side aligned, closed eyes, four hands, 5 head serpent with female god Shre Devi and Bhudevi. There is no such similarity. So it can be concluded that the statue may be 23rd or 17th tirthankara of jainism Parshvanatha. More particularly, the 8 head serpent in the cave leading to a new topic of research in the respective field.

Transport 
The only means of connectivity for the caves is by road. APSRTC operates bus services from Vijayawada, Guntur and Amaravathi to this location. APCRDA runs Tourist Bus-cum-Boat services through Krishna River from Prakasam Barrage.

Notes

External links

 Undavalli Caves
 Caves in Andhra Padesh

Caves of Andhra Pradesh
Buddhist caves in India
Buddhist monasteries in India
Tourist attractions in Guntur district
Archaeological sites in Andhra Pradesh
Buddhist sites in Andhra Pradesh
Jain rock-cut architecture
Geography of Guntur district
Monuments of National Importance in Andhra Pradesh
Jain caves in India
4th-century religious buildings and structures